The 2021–22 season is Bengaluru FC's ninth season as a club since its establishment in 2013. The Blues participated in AFC Cup, Durand Cup and finished sixth in their fifth Indian Super League season. All domestic league games of Bengaluru were held behind closed doors at GMC Athletic Stadium due to COVID-19 pandemic.

Background

Transfers
During the month of June, Bengaluru FC announced the contract extensions of Sunil Chhetri and Suresh Singh Wangjam. Chhetri extended his stay at the club for another two years and Suresh for three years. On 2 July Bengaluru FC announced that Gabonese defender Yrondu Musavu-King signed a two-year extension with the club.

On 29 June Bengaluru FC announced signing of midfielder Rohit Kumar on a two-year deal. On 6 July Bengaluru FC announced signing of defender Alan Costa from Brazilian club Avaí FC on a two-year loan. On 12 July Bengaluru FC announced signing of defender Sarthak Golui on a two-year deal.

At the end of the 2020–21 season defender Rahul Bheke and midfielders Dimas Delgado and Harmanjot Khabra parted ways with the club. On 28 June Bengaluru FC announced release of Spanish defender Juanan on mutual consent.

In

Loan In

Out

Preseason

Competitions

Overview

Indian Super League

Summary

League table

Result summary

Results by round

Matches

AFC Cup

Qualifying play-offs

Play-off round
Due to the COVID-19 pandemic Play-off round between Bengaluru FC and Eagles FC scheduled for May 2021 postponed to 15 August 2021.

Group stage

Durand Cup

Group stage

Knockout stage

Management
As of 26 April 2022

Player statistics

Appearances and goals

|-
! colspan=12 style=background:#2545A0;color:white; text-align:center| Goalkeepers

|-
! colspan=12 style=background:#2545A0;color:white; text-align:center| Defenders
|-

|-
! colspan=12 style=background:#2545A0;color:white; text-align:center| Midfielders
|-

|-
! colspan=12 style=background:#2545A0;color:white;  text-align:center| Forwards
|-

|-

Updated: 24 April 2022

Goal scorers

Source: soccerway
Updated: 24 April 2021

Clean sheets

Source: soccerway
Updated: 26 April 2022

Disciplinary record

Source: soccerway
Updated: 28 August 2021

See also
 2021–22 in Indian football

References

Notes

Bengaluru FC seasons
2020s in Bangalore
Bengaluru